was a Japanese swimmer. He competed in the men's 1500 metre freestyle event at the 1928 Summer Olympics and the water polo tournament at the 1932 Summer Olympics.

References

External links
 

1909 births
1995 deaths
Japanese male freestyle swimmers
Japanese male water polo players
Olympic swimmers of Japan
Olympic water polo players of Japan
Swimmers at the 1928 Summer Olympics
Water polo players at the 1932 Summer Olympics
Place of birth missing
20th-century Japanese people